Kuskokwim Bay is a bay in southwestern Alaska, at about .

The Kuskokwim River empties into Kuskokwim Bay.  The bay got its name from the river. The largest community on the bay is the city of Quinhagak.

Bays of the Bering Sea
Bays of Alaska
Bodies of water of Bethel Census Area, Alaska